Castle Bridge is a grade II* listed road bridge in Warwick, Warwickshire, England, which carries the A425 road over the River Avon.

In 1788, the Earl of Warwick, George Greville had obtained an Act of Parliament to build a new bridge over the Avon. The bridge was built between 1790 and 1793, at a cost of around £3,258, some 400 metres east of Warwick Castle. It consists of a single arch made from sandstone.

It replaced an older medieval bridge further downstream, which became known as Old Castle Bridge, and is now a ruin.

References

Buildings and structures in Warwick
Bridges in Warwickshire
Grade II* listed buildings in Warwickshire
Bridges completed in 1793
Arch bridges in the United Kingdom